Kisurra (modern Tell Abu Hatab, Al-Qādisiyyah Governorate, Iraq) was an ancient Sumerian tell (hill city)  situated on the west bank of the Euphrates,  north of Shuruppak and due east of Kish.

History
Kisurra was established ca. 2700 BC,  during the Sumerian Early Dynastic II period. The southern end of the Isinnitum Canal was joined back into the Euphrates at Kisurra. The city lasted as a center for commerce and transport through the  Akkadian, Ur III, and part of the Babylonian Empires, until cuneiform texts and excavation show a decline during the time of Hammurabi (c.1800 BC). The Larsa ruler Rim-Sin (1822 to 1763 BC) reports capturing Kisurra in his 20th year of reign.The Babylonian ruler Samsu-iluna (1750 BC to 1712 BC), successor to Hammurabi, reports destroying Kisurra in his 13th year. Several kings of Kisurra are known: Itur-Szamasz (who built the temples of Annunitum, Enki, and Adad), Manabaltiel (who built the temple of Ninurta and was a contemporary of Ur-Ninurta of Isin), Szarrasyurrum, Ubaya, Zikrum, Bur-Sin, and Ibbi-Szamasz.

Archaeology
The site has an area of about 46 hectares which is primarily Ur III and a northern extension of about 17 hectares which is primarily Early Dynastic II-III. German archaeologist Robert Koldewey with the Deutsche Orient-Gesellschaft, who excavated at the site in 1902-1903, found many cuneiform tablets from Tell Abu Hatab. In 2016 the QADIS survey project, carried out an aerial and surface survey of the site.

List of rulers of Kisurra

See also
Cities of the Ancient Near East
Tell (archaeology)

Notes

Further reading
Anne Goddeeris, Tablets from Kisurra in the collections of The British Museum, Harrasowitz, 2009, 
Anne Goddeeris, The Economic Basis of the Local Palace of Kisurra, Zeitschrift für Assyriologie und vorderasiatische Archäologie, vol. 97, issue 1, pp. 47–85, 2007
Blocher, Felix. “Zur Glyptik Aus Kisurra.” Forschungen Und Berichte, vol. 29, pp. 25–35, 1990
Burkhart Kienast, Die altbabylonischen Briefe und Urkunden aus Kisurra, Steiner, 1978, 
E. J. Banks, Impressions from the Excavations by the Germans at Fara and Abu Hatab, Biblical World, vol. 24, pp. 138–146, 1904
Burkhart Kienast, "Die altbabylonischen Briefe und Urkunden aus Kisurra, Volumes 1-2", Steiner, 1978 ISBN 9783515025928
Witold Tyborowski, New Tablets from Kisurra and the Chronology of Central Babylonia in the Early Old Babylonian Period, Zeitschrift für Assyriologie und Vorderasiatische Archäologie, vol. 102, iss. 2, pp. 245–269, 2012, ISSN 0084-5299

External links
Old Babylonian text Corpus at Freiburger Altorientalische studies - in german
Kisurra related Year Names at CDLI

Al-Qādisiyyah Governorate
Sumerian cities
Archaeological sites in Iraq
Former populated places in Iraq